The number 32 is a bus route that operates from Gloucester to Newent, with some journeys continuing to Ross-on-Wye. It is run on a commercial basis.

The route previously continued to Ross-on-Wye or Ledbury on alternating hours. The Gloucester–Ledbury services were numbered 132, but shared the same route as the 32

The route previously continued to Ross-on-Wye or Ledbury on alternating hours. The Gloucester–Ledbury services were numbered 132, but shared the same route as the 32 between Gloucester and Newent. In January 2022, it was announced that the extensions to Ledbury would be withdrawn along with most extensions to Ross-on-Wye, leaving an hourly 32 service between Gloucester and Newent with two journeys per day extended to Ross-on-Wye.

On 28 January 2022, two students from John Kyrle High School started a petition for the routes to be retained and received around 1,000 signatures. However, Herefordshire Council stated that it was unlikely the route could be retained as the subsidy required would be a quarter of the council's bus subsidy budget.

The changes to the routes were scheduled to come into effect on 27 February 2022.

References 

Bus routes in England
Transport in Gloucestershire
Transport in Herefordshire